"Let Me Serenade You" is a song written by John Finley. The original version of the song was entitled "I Will Serenade You" and performed by Rhinoceros, appearing on their 1968 self-titled album. It was later covered by Three Dog Night and featured on their 1973 album, Cyan.  This version was produced by Richard Podolor and arranged by Podolor and Three Dog Night.

In the US, Three Dog Night's version "Let Me Serenade You" peaked at #17 on the Billboard chart. Outside the US, "Let Me Serenade You" reached #11 in Canada.

Cover versions
Melissa Manchester released a version of the song on her 1977 album, Singin'....

References

1968 songs
1973 singles
Three Dog Night songs
Melissa Manchester songs
Dunhill Records singles
Songs written by John Finley (musician)